Kalyan Jain (born 13 August 1934 in Indore, Madhya Pradesh) was a member of the 6th Lok Sabha of India. He represented the Indore constituency of Madhya Pradesh and is a member of the Janata Party. He was also member of Samyukta Socialist Party, Socialist Party and Bharatiya Lok Dal.

References

India MPs 1977–1979
1934 births
Living people
Bharatiya Lok Dal politicians
Janata Party politicians
Samyukta Socialist Party politicians
Lok Sabha members from Madhya Pradesh
Politicians from Indore
Madhya Pradesh MLAs 1977–1980
Janata Dal politicians
Samajwadi Party politicians